The Machell-Seaman House, also known as the Seaman House and the Seaman-Foshay House, is a Queen Anne-Eastlake style Victorian house in the West Adams section of Los Angeles, California. The house was built in 1888 and designed by architect Joseph Cather Newsom.  The house was listed on the National Register of Historic Places in 1988 based on its well-preserved architecture. In 1989, it was declared a Historic-Cultural Monument (No. 408) by the Los Angeles Cultural Heritage Commission.

See also
 List of Registered Historic Places in Los Angeles
 List of Los Angeles Historic-Cultural Monuments in South Los Angeles
 West Adams, Los Angeles, California

References

Queen Anne architecture in California
Victorian architecture in California
Houses on the National Register of Historic Places in Los Angeles
Los Angeles Historic-Cultural Monuments
Houses completed in 1888
West Adams, Los Angeles